Matt Dzieduszycki (born April 8, 1980 in Calgary, Alberta) is a Canadian former professional ice hockey centre currently playing for the Stoney Creek Generals in the Senior men's Allan Cup Hockey.

Playing career
Dzieduszycki turned pro in 2002, playing 66 games for the American Hockey League's Syracuse Crunch and 10 games for the ECHL's Dayton Bombers.  In 2003, he moved to the San Antonio Rampage of the AHL and also had spells in the ECHL for the Augusta Lynx and the Louisiana IceGators during their run in the playoffs.  Dzieduszycki returned to the Lynx before moving to the Las Vegas Wranglers and also had a brief spell in France's Ligue Magnus for HC Morzine-Avoriaz.  He moved to Germany in 2006, signing for Füchse Duisburg before moving to the Hannover Scorpions in 2007.

On April 27, 2011, Dzieduszycki left the Scorpions after four seasons and signed a two-year contract to remain in Germany with Grizzly Adams Wolfsburg.

On June 15, 2015, as a free agent Dzieduszycki left Germany and signed in Neighbouring Austria, on a one-year contract with the Vienna Capitals of the EBEL.

Career statistics

References

External links

1980 births
Augusta Lynx players
Barrie Colts players
Canadian ice hockey centres
Dayton Bombers players
Füchse Duisburg players
Hannover Scorpions players
HC Morzine-Avoriaz players
Ice hockey people from Alberta
Las Vegas Wranglers players
Living people
Louisiana IceGators (ECHL) players
New Hampshire Wildcats men's ice hockey players
San Antonio Rampage players
Syracuse Crunch players
Vienna Capitals players
Western Mustangs men's ice hockey players
Grizzlys Wolfsburg players
Canadian expatriate ice hockey players in Austria
Canadian expatriate ice hockey players in France
Canadian expatriate ice hockey players in Germany